"Cornflake Girl" is a song by American singer-songwriter Tori Amos. It was released as the first single from her second studio album, Under the Pink, on January 10, 1994, by EastWest Records in the United Kingdom, and on May 5, 1994, by Atlantic Records in North America. Singer Merry Clayton provided backing vocals and sang the "man with the golden gun" bridge.

Peaking at number seven on the US Billboard Bubbling Under Hot 100, "Cornflake Girl" also experienced commercial success worldwide. It peaked at number four on the UK Singles Chart, number nine on the Irish Singles Chart, and number two in Iceland. In Australia, Belgium, Canada and the Netherlands, it reached the top 40.

Inspiration and meaning
The inspiration for "Cornflake Girl" came from a conversation Tori Amos was having with a longtime friend about female genital mutilation in Africa, specifically how a close female family member would betray the victim by performing the procedure. Amos has said that growing up, the name they gave to girls who would hurt you despite close friendship was cornflake girls.

The reference to corn flakes and raisins comes from their distribution in a box of breakfast cereal, implying that "raisin girls" are much harder to find than "cornflake girls".  Amos has spoken in interviews about being referred to glibly as "the cornflake girl" due to the song's title being applied to her, when she considers herself a "raisin girl". Moreover, she specifically states in the first line of the song: "Never was a cornflake girl."  Atlantic released a series of corn flakes boxes with pictures of Amos on them to promote the single, which are now collectible items.

Amos appeared in a commercial filmed in 1984 for Kellogg's Just Right, made before her widespread fame. Just Right includes corn flakes, raisins, and dates, but the song and the cereal are unrelated.

The term "cornflake girl" also appears in the lyrics of the Billy Bragg song "Body of Water" on his 1991 album Don't Try This at Home with the line "Oh, to become a pearl / In the wordy world of the cornflake girl".

Release
Two separate "Cornflake Girl" CD singles were released in the UK.  The first, released on January 10, 1994, contains three original b-sides: "Sister Janet", "All the Girls Hate Her" and "Over It"; the latter two being part of a Piano Suite.  The second, released on January 17, 1994, was a limited edition picture CD housed in a digipak, containing cover versions of the songs "A Case of You" by Joni Mitchell, "If 6 Was 9" by Jimi Hendrix and "Strange Fruit" by Billie Holiday.  The first CD single was replicated for the German and Australasian release, and its b-sides were re-used for the US "God" and "Cornflake Girl" releases.  Other than "A Case of You" appearing on a US promotional CD compilation and a limited 2-CD Australian tour edition of "Under the Pink", the three cover versions on the limited UK "Cornflake Girl" CD single have not been released on any other title to date, and are not available to purchase through digital retailers.  As such, this CD remains a collectible item.

Reception
Ned Raggett from AllMusic described the "contemporaneous" song as "a waltz-paced number with an unnerving whistle and stuttering vocal hook." Larry Flick from Billboard noted it as a "bouncy, piano-driven single". He added, "As always, Amos weaves lyrics that push you to think as well as hum" and "this could be the big hit Amos has been waiting for." Troy J. Augusto from Cash Box wrote, "More painful confessional from Amos, a gifted singer-songwriter with a knack for making childhood pain perfect top-40 fodder. Reminiscent of early Kate Bush, this track will look to alternative and college radio for acceptance first, with rock outlets hopefully responding as well. Thematically, a bit depressing for hits stations, but an affecting, important release nonetheless." A reviewer from Music & Media stated, "Amos is no musical Tory; she's as progressive and challenging as can be. But then again, this cornflake girl wouldn't have been what she is without having eaten from Kate Bush's cereal." John Kilgo from The Network Forty called it "trademark Tori Amos from the lyrics to the grassroots cadence." Mark Frith from Smash Hits gave it two out of five, describing it as a "melancholy tune that doesn't go anywhere." Keeley Bolger commented in the 2010 book, 1001 Songs You Must Hear Before You Die, that it "could sound depressing in the wrong hands, but Amos's charm conjures up a song that is as otherworldly as its subject. The piano cascades, soft percussion, and ghostly chorus set it apart from the plod of Britpop and post-grunge dominating transatlantic charts at the time."

The song reached number four on the UK Singles Chart and was Amos' most successful international hit at the time. The single peaked within the top 10 in Ireland and Iceland, and within the top 20 in Australia. It was placed at number 35 on the Australian radio station Triple J's 1994 Hottest 100 poll, and ranked in Blender magazine's The 500 Greatest Songs Since You Were Born at number 433.

Music video
There were produced two different music videos for "Cornflake Girl". The UK version was directed by Big TV!, two directors from the UK. Amos said that is based on The Wizard of Oz, except that Dorothy goes to Hell instead. Amos stated that she wanted there to be "two different visual expressions" of the song. The US video features Amos driving a truck full of women around a typical American desert.

Track listings

 US CD single
 "Cornflake Girl" (edit) – 3:53
 "Sister Janet" – 4:01
 "Daisy Dead Petals" – 3:02
 "Honey" – 3:47

 US cassette single
 "Cornflake Girl" (edit) – 3:53
 "Honey" – 3:47

 Canadian and Australian CD single, UK CD1
 "Cornflake Girl" – 5:05
 "Sister Janet" – 4:02
 Piano Suite
 "All the Girls Hate Her" – 2:23
 "Over It" – 2:11

 UK CD2
 "Cornflake Girl" – 5:05
 "A Case of You" – 4:38
 "If 6 Was 9" – 3:59
 "Strange Fruit" – 4:00

 UK 7-inch and cassette single
 "Cornflake Girl" – 5:05
 "Sister Janet" – 4:01

Credits and personnel
Credits are adapted from the Under the Pink album booklet.

Studios
 Recorded at The Fishhouse (New Mexico, US)
 Mixed at Olympic Studios (London, England)
 Mastered at Gateway Mastering (Portland, Maine, US)

Personnel

 Tori Amos – writing, vocals, piano, production
 Merry Clayton – guest vocals
 Steve Clayton – guitar, mandolin
 George Porter Jr. – bass
 Carlo Nuccio – drums
 Paulinho da Costa – percussion
 Eric Rosse – production, recording (guitars, other instruments), programming
 John Beverly Jones – recording (vocals, piano, percussion)
 Paul McKenna – recording (bass, drums)
 Kevin Killen – mixing
 Bob Ludwig – mastering

Charts

Weekly charts

Year-end charts

Release history

Cover versions
The song was covered by post-hardcore band Jawbox as a hidden track on their self-titled 1996 album, as well as by the band Tapping the Vein on the Tori Amos tribute album, Songs of a Goddess. In 2007, after Amos had to pull out of an appearance on the Australian comedy program The Sideshow, musical comedy trio Tripod performed the song in her place.

On March 25, 2010, British electronic musician Imogen Heap covered the song live in Australia. The performance was done per request by the winner of an online charity auction who paid about US$4000 to win the item "VIP Experience Meet Imogen Heap + A Song Just For You".

On September 19, 2018, the British band Florence + The Machine released their version of this song, exclusively for Spotify.

A cover version performed by Jeff Russo and Noah Hawley was used for the soundtrack to season 2 of the Legion TV series.

References

1994 singles
1994 songs
Atlantic Records singles
East West Records singles
Music videos directed by Big T.V.
Song recordings produced by Eric Rosse
Songs with feminist themes
Songs written by Tori Amos
Tori Amos songs